Miss International 1996, the 36th Miss International pageant, was held on October 26, 1996 at the Kanazawa Kagekiza in Kanazawa, Ishikawa, Japan. Fernanda Alves earned Portugal's first Miss International crown.

Results

Placements

Contestants

  - Maria Xenia Bordón
  - Julisa Marie Lampe
  - Kylie Ann Watson
  - Barbara Van der Beken
  - Elka Grothenhorst Pacheco
  - Ana Carina Góis Homa
  - Shauna Marie Gunn
  - Alexandra De Granade Errázuriz
  - Claudia Inés de Torcoroma Mendoza Lemus
  - Zdenka Zadrazilova
  - Sandra Natasha Abreu Matusevicius
  - Ranjani Roshini Dayal
  - Ulrika Therese Wester
  - Nancy Cornelia Delettrez
  - Andrea Walaschewski
  - Rania Likoudi
  - Karla Hannelore Beteta Forkel
  - Kam Au
  - Leonie Maria Boon
  - Fiona Yuen Choi-Wan
  - Audur Geirsdóttir
  - Fleur Dominique Xavier
  - Ann Konopny
  - Akiko Sugano
  - Kim Jung-hwa
  - Christiane Lorent
  - Aleksandra Petko Petrovska
  - Mary Farrugia
  - Tania Lise Chitty
  - Kathleen Williams
  - Eva-Charlotte Stenset
  - Betzy Janethe Achurra
  - Claudia Rocío Melgarejo
  - Yedda Marie Mendoza Kittilsvedt
  - Monika Marta Adamek
  - Fernanda Alves
  - Lydia Guzmán López
  - Yuliya Vladimirovna Ermolenko
  - Carel Siok Liang Low
  - Martina Jajcayova
  - Rosa Maria Casado Teixidor
  - Amanda Adama Bawa
  - Ibticem Lahmar
  - Gokce Yanardag
  - Nataliya Vasilievna Kozitskaya
  - Maya Yadira Kashak
  - Carla Andreína Steinkopf Struve
  - Phạm Anh Phương

Did not compete

  - Priscilla Ruiz
  - Gloria Ondina Rivera

Notes

1996
1996 in Japan
1996 beauty pageants
Beauty pageants in Japan